The 2021–22 Adelaide United FC season is the club's 17th season since its establishment in 2003. The club is participating in the A-League Men for the 16th time, and in the FFA Cup for the 7th time.

Players

Squad information

Transfers

Transfers in

Transfers out

From youth squad

Contract extensions

Technical staff

Pre-season and friendlies

Competitions

Overview

A-League

League table

Results summary

Results by round

Matches

Finals series

FFA Cup

Statistics

Appearances and goals
Players with no appearances not included in the list.

Disciplinary record

Clean sheets

References

Adelaide United FC seasons
2021–22 A-League Men season by team